Biodegradation is a peer-reviewed scientific journal covering biotransformation, mineralization, detoxification, recycling, amelioration or treatment of chemicals or waste materials by naturally occurring microbial strains, microbial associations or recombinant organisms.

According to the Journal Citation Reports, the journal has a 2020 impact factor of 3.909. The editor-in-chief of the journal is Claudia K. Gunsch (Duke University).

References 

Springer Science+Business Media academic journals
English-language journals
Waste management journals
Biodegradation